Sir John Rhŷs,  (also spelled Rhys; 21 June 1840 – 17 December 1915) was a Welsh scholar, fellow of the British Academy, Celticist and the first professor of Celtic at Oxford University.

Early years and education
He was born John Rees at Ponterwyd in Ceredigion, to a lead miner and farmer, Hugh Rees, and his wife. Rhŷs was educated at schools in Bryn-chwyth, Pantyffynnon  and Ponterwyd before moving to the British School, a recently opened institution at Penllwyn, in 1855. Here Rhŷs was enrolled as a pupil and teacher, and after leaving studied at Bangor Normal College from 1860 to 1861. Upon leaving Bangor Normal College, Rhŷs gained employment as headmaster at Rhos-y-bol, Anglesey. It was here that Rhŷs was introduced to Dr Charles Williams, then the Principal of Jesus College, Oxford, in 1865. This meeting eventually led to Rhŷs being accepted into the college, where he studied literae humaniores. In 1869, he was elected to a fellowship at Merton College.

Rhŷs also travelled and studied in Europe during this period, staying in Paris, Heidelberg, Leipzig, and Göttingen. He attended lectures by Georg Curtius and August Leskien whilst in Leipzig, and it was during this period that his interest in philology and linguistics developed. Rhŷs matriculated from Leipzig in 1871, and it was around this time that he adopted the Welsh spelling of his name. He returned to Wales as a government inspector of schools, covering Flint and Denbigh, and he settled in Rhyl.   Rhŷs also began to write, with articles on the grammar of the Celtic language and articles on the glosses in the Luxembourg manuscript being printed, the latter in the Revue Celtique. In 1872 Rhŷs married Elspeth Hughes-Davies.

Career
In 1874 Rhŷs delivered a series of lectures in Aberystwyth, later published as Lectures on Welsh Philology, which served to establish his reputation as a leading scholar of the Celtic language. This reputation saw him appointed as the first Professor of Celtic at Oxford University in 1877. He was also made a Fellow of Jesus College, Oxford. Rhŷs was elected bursar of the college in 1881, a position he held until 1895, when he succeeded Daniel Harper as principal.

Rhŷs served on several public bodies.
1881 – Lord Aberdare's departmental committee on Welsh education
1887 – Secretary to the commission on the tithe agitation in Wales
1889 – Royal Commission on Sunday closing in Wales 
1893 – Royal Commission on Land Tenure in Wales
1891 – Royal Commission on University Education in Ireland
1907 – Sir Thomas Raleigh's commission on the Welsh university and its constituent colleges
1908 – Chief Baron Palles's commission for a national university of Ireland
1908 – First chairman of the Royal Commission on the Ancient and Historical Monuments of Wales, a post that he held until his death.

Awards
Rhŷs gained his knighthood in 1907, and in 1911 was appointed to the Privy Council. Rhŷs was one of the founding Fellows of The British Academy when it was given its royal charter in 1902, and after his death the academy established an annual lecture in his name, the Sir John Rhŷs Memorial Lecture. The Oxford Dictionary of National Biography declares him to be "foremost among the scholars of his time" in his published fields, noting that "his pioneering studies provided a firm foundation for future Celtic scholarship and research for many decades."

Works
 Lectures on Welsh Philology (1877)
 Celtic Britain (1882, last edition 1908)
 Lectures on the Origin and Growth of Religion as Illustrated by Celtic Heathendom (1888, based on lectures delivered in 1886)
 Studies in the Arthurian Legend (1891)
 Celtic Folklore, Welsh and Manx (1901)
 The Welsh People (with D. B. Jones, 1900)

John Morris-Jones and Rhŷs prepared an edition of The Elucidarium and other tracts in Welsh from Llyvyr agkyr Llandewivrevi A.D. 1346 (The Book of the Anchorite of Llanddewi Brefi), a collection of Medieval Welsh manuscripts in the library of Jesus College Oxford, which they published in 1894. In the 1890s, Rhŷs and his daughter Olwen decoded a Greek and Latin cryptogram in the Juvencus Manuscript.

References

External links

 
Sir John Rhys Memorial Lectures
Sir John Rhys at the National Portrait Gallery
Sir John Rhys Papers

1840 births
1915 deaths
Knights Bachelor
Celtic studies scholars
Fellows of Jesus College, Oxford
Principals of Jesus College, Oxford
Fellows of Merton College, Oxford
Fellows of the British Academy
Members of the Privy Council of the United Kingdom
Linguists from Wales
Members of the Cambrian Archaeological Association
Welsh non-fiction writers
Alumni of Jesus College, Oxford
Jesus Professors of Celtic
Arthurian scholars
Burials at Holywell Cemetery